Adolfus masavaensis, also known as the western alpine meadow lizard, is a species of lizard. It is known from the Aberdare Mountains in Kenya and Mount Elgon on the Kenya/Uganda border.

References

Adolfus
Lacertid lizards of Africa
Reptiles of Kenya
Reptiles of Uganda
Reptiles described in 2014
Taxa named by William Roy Branch
Taxa named by Eli Greenbaum
Taxa named by Philipp Wagner